Nizhneye Zadolgoye is a rural locality (a village) in Dobryansky District, Perm Krai, Russia. The population was 147 as of 2010. There are 12 streets.

Geography 
Nizhneye Zadolgoye is located 31 km south of Dobryanka (the district's administrative centre) by road. Kumorova Zavod is the nearest rural locality.

References 

Rural localities in Dobryansky District